The Order of the Flag was an honorary award given to citizens, collectives, factories, administrative divisions, institutions and organizations in the People's Socialist Republic of Albania.

Definition
The order was given to citizens, districts, cities, villages, social organizations, institutions, enterprises, agricultural cooperatives, sectors, brigades, military units and groups of employees for activities and great merits in the socialist construction of the country and in strengthening the capacity to defend the Fatherland, for high quantitative and qualitative achievements in industry, mining, agriculture, construction, transport, etc.. and for high merits in the field of science, education, art and culture.

See also
Orders, decorations and medals of Albania

References

Awards established in 1945
Orders, decorations, and medals of Albania